Gerd Riss (born 17 March 1965) is a German former professional motorcycle speedway rider.

Speedway career
He was a member of Germany team at 2001 Speedway World Cup and who was started in Speedway Grand Prix of Germany. Riss won the title a record eight times (1996, 1996, 1999, 2001, 2004, 2007-2009). In 2014, He was named an FIM Legend for his motorcycling achievements.

Speedway

World final appearances

Individual World Championship
 1987 -  Amsterdam, Olympic Stadium - 10th - 12pts
 1989 -  Munich, Olympic Stadium - 9th - 5pts
 1991 -  Göteborg, Ullevi - 16th - 1pt
 1993 -  Pocking, Rottalstadion - 11th - 6pts

World Pairs Championship
 1988* -  Bradford, Odsal Stadium (with Tommy Dunker) - 8th - 21pts (17)
 1989* -  Leszno, Alfred Smoczyk Stadium (with Karl Maier) - 4th - 36pts (14)
 1990* -  Landshut, Ellermühle Stadium (with Klaus Lausch) - 9th - 15pts (0)
 1991** -  Poznań, Olimpia Poznań Stadium (with Klaus Lausch - 4th - 18pts (9)

* Competed for West Germany.

** Competed for Germany.

Grand Prix

World (European) Under-21 Championship
 1985 -  Abensberg, Motorstadion - 5th - 9pts
 1986 -  Rivne - 13th - 4pts

European Championships
European Club Champions' Cup
 1999 -  Bydgoszcz - 2nd - Reserve - 0pts

German Domestic competitions 
German Speedway Championship
 1992 - Winner
 1993 - 2nd
 1994 - Winner
 1995 - 2nd
 1996 - Winner
 1999 - 2nd

Longtrack

World Championship Finals

 1984  Herxheim (6th) 13pts
 1985  Esbjerg (8th) 15pts
 1986  Pfarrkirchen (4th) 17pts
 1987  Mühldorf (9th) 9pts
 1988  Scheeßel (5th) 26pts
 1989  Marianske Lazne (11th) 12pts
 1990  Herxheim (14th) 9pts
 1991  Marianske Lazne (Champion) 24pts
 1992  Pfarrkirchen (4th) 18pts
 1993  Mühldorf (16th) 5pts
 1994  Marianske Lazne(Third) 17pts
 1995  Scheeßel (Did not ride)
 1996  Herxheim (Champion) 25pts

Grand-Prix Years

 1998 4 app (4th) 59pts
 1999 5 app (Champion) 115pts
 2000 1 app (18th) 17pts
 2001 4 app (Champion) 95pts
 2002 5 app (Third) 89pts
 2003 6 app (Third) 98pts
 2004 5 app (Champion) 103pts
 2005 4 app (Second) 75pts
 2006 3 app (Third) 50pts
 2007 3 app (Champion) 53pts
 2008 4 app (Champion) 79pts
 2009 5 app (Champion) 126pts
 2010 3 app (13th) 53pts

Best Grand-Prix Results

  Berghaupten First 1999
  Bielefeld First 2004, Second  2002, Third 2003
  Collier Street First 2001, Third 2003
  Eenrum Second  1999
  Harsewinkel Third 2000
  Herxheim First 2001, 2009
  Jubeck First 1999
  Marianske Lazne First 2009, Second  2008
  Marmande First 2009, Second  1999, 2007, Third 2006
  Morizes First 2008, Second  2001, 2004
  Mulhdorf First 1998, 1999, 2005, Third 2003
  New Plymouth First 2004, Second  2003
  Parchim First 2001, 2002, 2005
  Pfarrkirchen Second 2004, 2007
  Scheeßel Second  1998
  St. Macaire Second 2010, Third 2008
  Vechta First 2009

West Germany Longtrack Championship
 1985  Pfarrkirchen (6th) 
 1986  Jübek (4th) 
 1987  Herxheim (5th) 
 1988  Pfarrkirchen (Champion)
 1989  Harsewinkel (4th)

German Championship
 1991  Mühldorf (Champion)
 1992  Scheeßel (Third) 
 1993  Jübek (Second) 
 1994  Vilshofen (Second) 
 1995  Pfarrkirchen (Champion) 
 1996  Scheeßel (Champion) 
 1997  Lüdinghausen (Champion) 
 1998  Pfarrkirchen (Champion) 
 1999  Herxheim (Second) 
 2001  Berghaupten (Second) 
 1902  Harsewinkel (Champion) 
 1903  Lüdinghausen (Second) 
 1904  Mühldorf (Champion) 
 1906  Berghaupten (4th) 
 1907  Mulmshorn (Champion) 
 1908  Pfarrkirchen (Second) 
 1909  Mühldorf (Champion)

Grasstrack

European Championship

 2003  La Reole (Champion) 21pts
 2004  Eenrum (Second) 16ps
 2005  Schwarme (15th) 5pts

Family
Both of his sons Erik Riss and Mark Riss ride at the highest level.

See also
 Germany national speedway team
 List of Speedway Grand Prix riders

References

External links
 http://grasstrackgb.co.uk/gerd-riss/
 (de) GerdRiss.de - official website

1965 births
German speedway riders
Polonia Bydgoszcz riders
Living people
German expatriate sportspeople in Poland
Place of birth missing (living people)
Individual Speedway Long Track World Championship riders